Koen Maria Gaston Wauters (born 17 September 1967) is a Flemish singer, active with the band Clouseau, television presenter, and occasionally actor and race car driver.

Biography
Koen Wauters was born in Halle in 1967. Together with his three brothers and two sisters he spent his youth in Sint-Genesius-Rode. In his youth, Koen Wauters was a keen footballer, but all dreams of a possible pro career ended when he suffered from repeated knee injuries.

Musical career
In 1987, Koen and his brother Kris joined the local band Clouseau. Koen became the frontman and singer of the band. The band and Koen became household names in Flanders in 1989, when the single Anne became a huge hit. Over the next twenty years, Clouseau became the most popular band in Flanders.

Actor
Koen Wauters has acted in 2 Dutch movies, My Blue Heaven (1990) and Intensive Care (1991).

Television presenter
Koen Wauters started his career as a TV presenter in 1989, as one of the first faces for the new Flemish TV station vtm. He has presented shows like De Super 50 (a hitparade show), Familieraad, Wedden dat?, 1 tegen 100 and Op zoek naar Maria.

Together with his brother Kris Wauters, also a member of Clouseau, he presented all three seasons of the Flemish version of Pop Idol, Idool 2003, Idool 2004 and Idool 2007. He also hosted X Factor (Belgium) in 2005. Since 2011, he has been one of the coach in The Voice van Vlaanderen, and since 2012, he has been presenting Belgium's Got Talent on vtm.

Race car driver 
The main hobby of Koen Wauters is race car driving. He has competed in the Dakar Rally 11 times, and finished 9 times. Together with his brother Kris, he competes in the Belgian GT Championship. His first win in this championship was at the Spa-Francorchamps circuit on 10 May 2009.

It is a little-known fact that Koen Wauters also participated as a co-driver on the Legend Boucles de Spa, both 2010 and 2011. He was co-driver to Marc Duez, another well-known Belgian racing driver for the FSE-team, together with other legendary drivers such as Ari Vatanen, Robert Droogmans and Jacques Castelein.

Wauters made one appearance in the NASCAR Whelen Euro Series in 2018 at the season finale round at Circuit Zolder. He drove for PK Carsport in the No. 24 entry, substituting for Anthony Kumpen who had been suspended earlier in the year by the Royal Automobile Club of Belgium for failing a drug test during the 2018 24 Hours of Zolder.

Personal life
After earlier relations with Babette van Veen and Dagmar Liekens, Koen Wauters met then MTV-presenter Carolyn Lilipaly in June 1998. They married on 22 December 1998, and divorced in 2001.

Koen Wauters married Valerie De Booser on 17 July 2004. They divorced in January 2020. They have two children, daughter Zita and son Nono.

Koen Wauters is also an ambassador for Plan Belgium.

Motorsports career results

NASCAR
(key) (Bold – Pole position awarded by qualifying time. Italics – Pole position earned by points standings or practice time. * – Most laps led.)

Whelen Euro Series – Elite 1

Notes

External links

1967 births
Living people
Belgian male singers
20th-century Flemish male actors
Belgian racing drivers
Flemish television presenters
Belgian pop singers
Belgian game show hosts
Eurovision Song Contest entrants of 1991
Eurovision Song Contest entrants for Belgium
Blancpain Endurance Series drivers
24 Hours of Spa drivers
24 Hours of Daytona drivers
NASCAR drivers
Flemish male film actors
People from Halle, Belgium
Boutsen Ginion Racing drivers